Mary Jones World is a small heritage centre located in Llanycil near Bala, Gwynedd, Wales. Situated on the north shore of Bala Lake, it provides information on Mary Jones, a fifteen-year-old girl from Llanfihangel-y-Pennant. After she had saved her money for six years, in 1800 Jones walked 26 miles to buy a copy of a Welsh-language Bible, which she thought would be available in Bala, only to find that they were sold out. The Reverend Thomas Charles was reputed to have given her his own spare copy.

The heritage centre is an initiative of the British and Foreign Bible Society and was opened on 5 October 2014 at a cost of £1.3 million in the former village church which was dedicated to Saint Beuno. It is open daily from April to October from 10am to 5pm with free visitor parking and a café. As well as information about Mary the centre tells about the growth of the Bible Society, and Thomas Charles who sold Mary her bible is buried in the church yard of St Beuno. School group visits are encouraged and there is a children's play area next to the centre.

References

External links
Byd Mary Jones World – heritage centre official website
The Bible Society website

Religious museums in Wales
History museums in Wales
Biographical museums in Wales
Museums in Gwynedd
2014 establishments in Wales
Museums established in 2014
Bala, Gwynedd